Gemmula speciosa, common name the splendid turrid, is a species of sea snail, a marine gastropod mollusk in the family Turridae, the turrids.

Description
The length of the shell varies between 40 mm and 80 mm.

The shell is crenulately carinate or ribbed. The principal keel, forming the angle of the whorls, is broad and corded, with a sloping shoulder above it and studded with raised granules. The shell is yellowish white, the ribs ochraceous. The peripheral keel and the primary spiral cords show light-brown continuous lines.

Distribution
This marine species occurs in the Indo-West Pacific; in the South China Sea, Nansha Islands; Arabian Sea, Japan, the Philippines; off Papua New Guinea.

References

 Powell, A.W.B. (1964) The family Turridae in the Indo-Pacific. Part 1. The subfamily Turrinae. Indo-Pacific Mollusca, 1, 227–346.
 Liu, J.Y. [Ruiyu] (ed.). (2008). Checklist of marine biota of China seas. China Science Press. 1267 pp.
 Li B. [Baoquan] & Li X. [Xinzheng]. (2008). Report on the turrid genera Gemmula, Lophiotoma and Ptychosyrinx (Gastropoda: Turridae: Turrinae) from the China seas. Zootaxa. 1778: 1-25.

External links
  Reeve. "On new species of Pleurotoma, Clavatula, and Mangelia." ; Proceedings of the Zoological Society of London pt. 9-11 (1841-1843)
 Melvill J.C., 1917. A revision of the Turridae (Pleurotomidae) occurring in the Persian Gulf, Gulf of Oman and north Arabian Sea as evidenced mostly through the results of dredgings carried out by Mr F. W. Townsend, 1893~1914. Proc. Malac. Soc. Lond. 12: 140-201, pls. 8-10 
 Gastropods.com: Gemmula (Gemmula - speciosa group) speciosa
  Tucker, J.K. 2004 Catalog of recent and fossil turrids (Mollusca: Gastropoda). Zootaxa 682:1-1295.

speciosa
Gastropods described in 1842